Von Braun may refer to:

 Wernher von Braun (1912–1977), influential aerospace engineer
 Sigismund von Braun (1911–1998), German diplomat, Wernher's brother 
 Magnus von Braun (1919–2003), Chrysler Europe executive, Wernher's brother 
 Magnus von Braun (senior) (1878–1972), German politician, Minister of Agriculture 1932–1933, father of the three von Braun brothers
von Braun, lunar crater
 The VonBraun, a fictional faster-than-light starship from the 1999 personal computer game System Shock 2
 The Von Braun, a fusion-powered ship designed for a crewed mission to Jupiter in the manga and anime Planetes
 The Von Braun, a fictional, robotic, slower-than-light starship in the Discovery Channel special Alien Planet
 von Braun reaction, a reaction in organic chemistry
 von Braun amide degradation, a second related reaction

See also 
 Braun (surname)

German-language surnames
German noble families